Valea Albă may refer to several places in Romania:

 Valea Albă, a village in Bucium Commune, Alba County
 Valea Albă, a village in Războieni Commune, Neamț County
 Valea Albă (Barcău), a tributary of the Barcău in Bihor County
 Valea Albă (Câlniștea), a tributary of the Câlniștea in Teleorman County
 Valea Albă, a tributary of the Prahova in Prahova County
 Valea Albă (Tur), in Satu Mare County
 Valea Albă, a tributary of the Vărbilău in Prahova County

See also 
 Valea (disambiguation)